Sri Muthumariamman Temple (Tamil: ஸ்ரீ முத்துமாரியம்மன் கதிர்வேலாயுத சுவாமி கோவில்) is one of the famous Mariamman temples in Negombo built in a facet clicking back to the syles of Dravidian architecture. The temple still remains in an old fashioned pose. The engravings of the granite architecture in the temple is what that holds a reputation to the Negombo Tamils there as one of the most powerful temples where pujas and offering made, provide benefits to the public.

Interior
The interior of the temple starts with the presence of the Mariamman idol. This is the region where pujas, offering(abhishekam) and sangaabhishekham are made. The other parts cover the idol of Lord Vairava, Lord Ganesh, Kali Amman, Lord Murugan. The temple is supported financially by many Hindus to ensure that a corrective level of satisfaction is made to god.

Financial support
The temple currently gains its support from most of Negombo's financial investors

See also 
 Negombo
 Mariamman

Hindu temples in Gampaha District
Religious buildings and structures in Negombo
Mariamman temples in Sri Lanka